Transit Systems NSW, previously known as Transit Systems Sydney, is a bus operator in Sydney, New South Wales, Australia. It is a subsidiary of Transit Systems.

History
In November 2012, Transit Systems was awarded a contract by Transport for NSW to operate region 3 bus services in Western Sydney, taking over services operated by Busabout, Hopkinsons, Metro-link and Westbus. Transit Systems also took over route T80 on the Liverpool-Parramatta T-way from Western Sydney Buses. Operations commenced on 13 October 2013.

On 1 July 2018, Transit Systems took over the operation of region 6 from State Transit on an eight-year contract operating services in the Canterbury-Bankstown, Eastern Suburbs, Inner West, North Shore and St George regions.

In December 2022, after a tendering process, Transit Systems successfully retained region 3 and was additionally awarded the services in region 13, which will be consolidated into region 3. The new contract for the combined region will begin on 6 August 2023, with region 13 services to be taken over from Transdev NSW. The seven-year contract will expire on 30 November 2030.

Depots
Transit Systems operate two depots in region 3 Hoxton Park and Smithfield and four in region 6 Burwood, Kingsgrove, Leichhardt and Tempe.

Fleet
In region 3, Transit Systems operates a combination of buses inherited from its predecessors, 65 new built buses and some second hand purchases including Volgren bodied Mercedes-Benz OC 500 LEs from Brisbane Transport and some older high-floors purchased from the Dineen Group and Hopkinsons.  In mid 2017, Transit Systems purchased six Bustech CDi double deckers for use on route T80.

In region 6, Transit Systems inherited all of the Inner West State Transit fleet. This consists of a wide variety of different buses, both new and old, and with many different chassis and body types. Since they have acquired the contract, they have also purchased many new buses for this region. Most of these buses are similar to ones inherited from State Transit, but they have also bought buses from Gemilang Coachworks, which State Transit does not buy from. Transit Systems were also selected to trial 5 electric buses in the Inner West region.

As of July 2022, the total fleet consists of 858 buses, 488 of which are operated on behalf of Transport for NSW, approximately 236 buses operate in Region 3 & 622 buses operate in Region 6.

As of July 2022, Transit Systems NSW operates 55 electric buses and has announced plans to increase electrification of its buses.

References

External links

Bus transport in Sydney
Bus companies of New South Wales
Transport companies established in 2013
Australian companies established in 2013